Pammeces albivittella is a moth of the family Agonoxenidae. It was described by Philipp Christoph Zeller in 1863. It is found in Venezuela.

References

Moths described in 1863
Agonoxeninae
Moths of South America